The Safra massacre, or the Day of the Long Knives, occurred in the coastal town of Safra (north of Beirut) on 7 July 1980, during the Lebanese civil war, as part of Bashir Gemayel's effort to consolidate all the Christian fighters under his leadership in the Lebanese Forces. 

The Phalangist forces launched a surprise attack on the Tigers, a 500-man militia that was the armed force of the National Liberal Party of former Lebanese President Camille Chamoun. The attack was supposed to be conducted at around 4:00 a.m., but in order to spare the life of Camille's son and commander of the Tigers Dany Chamoun, the attack was postponed to 10:00 a.m. to make sure that Dany left for Fakra. The attack claimed the lives of roughly 83 people.

Prior to the attack, Camille Chamoun decided to disarm the militia in order to avoid further bloodshed from both the Phalangists and the Tigers. 

Since that time, the National Liberal Party has survived only as a political party although the Tigers were virtually wiped out.

See also
List of massacres in Lebanon

References

Short article on the Day of the Long Knives

Conflicts in 1980
Massacres in 1980
Battles of the Lebanese Civil War
Massacres of the Lebanese Civil War
1980 in Lebanon
Massacres in Lebanon
Keserwan District